The Afula railway station (Taḥanat HaRakevet Afula) is a railway station on the Beit She'an – Atlit line serving Afula and the surrounding communities. It opened in 2016.

Public transport connections 
There are several bus routes that stop at the station. All of them are operated by Superbus.

Near the station's entrance there is a bus terminal. Ten bus routes departing and terminating at the terminal except two one-way rush hour bus routes that only end at the terminal.
 Routes 15/16: Circular bus routes that serve the main part of the city.
 Route 49: from Yael via Meitav, Prazon and Avital to the station.
 Route 50: from Ram On via Dvora, Adirim, Barak and Hever to the station.
 Route 51: from Gadish via Ml'ea, Nir Yafeh and Omen to the station.
 Route 52: from Muqeible via Sandala and Gan Ner to the station.
 Route 57: from Gidona via Geva and Kfar Yehezkel to the station.
 Route 110: from Afula Illit neighbourhood to the station.
 Routes 115/116: One way rush hour bus routes to the station.
 Route 123: from Givat HaMoreh neighbourhood to the station.
 Route 147: from Iksal the station via Kfar Gidon. 
In addition to these bus routes, there are also a few bus routes at Yoash Dovnov street like 19, 44, 46, 350, 355.

References

External links 
 Israel Railways website

Railway stations in Northern District (Israel)
2016 establishments in Israel